Juma Khan Hamdard (born 1959) is an Afghan politician. He served as the security adviser to President Ashraf Ghani. He served as governor of Paktia Province from 2007 to 2015, previously serving as governor of Baghlan and later Jowzjan province. He is the head of the alliance of H.A.A Councils.

Early life
Hamdard is an ethnic Pashtun of the Wardak tribe from Mazari Sharif. He was born in 1959 in Balkh Province.

Career 
He became a popular leader of the Pashtun community of Balkh and Mazar-i-Sharif. Hamdard was a member of Hezbi Islami and fought against the Soviets under the leadership of Gulbuddin Hekmatyar. In 1994, his Party Hezbi Islami  allied with Abdul Rashid Dostum, an ethnic Uzbek, against the Shura-e Nazar. In 1997, he helped the Taliban's side against Dostum's forces in a bloody campaign.

Following the US-led coalition's invasion of Afghanistan in late 2001, Hamdard resumed a weak alliance with Dostum's forces. On the eve of the presidential election in October 2004, he pledged support to Karzai. He became governor of Baghlan, and later Jowzjan.

Dostum's power base was in the ethnic Uzbek heartland. His Uzbek supporters did not want an ethnic Pashtun as governor.  In May 2007 police forces under governor Juma khan Hamdard shot at militant Uzbek demonstrators, while they were trying to force their way into the Governor's office in Sheberghan, killing 13 and injuring more than 30. On December 17, 2007, he was appointed governor of Paktia Province, replacing Rahmatullah Rahmat. Hamdard is one of President Karzai's tribal affairs advisors.

Juma Khan Hamdard is an important personality of northern Afghanistan. He has played a pivotal role in safeguarding the interests of the Pashtuns. He enjoys a mass base of support among the Pashtun settlers in the Northern Afghanistan. He was a military commander and politician. Since the fall of the communist regime in 1992, he has trodden a very cautious approach in protecting the interests of Pashtuns in Northern Afghanistan in the wake of rising anti-Pashtun sentiments.

Personal life 
He has six sons, the eldest son Gul Rahman Hamdard is a member of the parliament.

References

External links
“Dostum: Afghanistan’s Embattled Warlord”. The Jamestown Foundation, April 18, 2008
“Reconstruction Team Serves on Front Line of War on Terror”. American Forces Press Service, February 10, 2009
“Balkh Power Struggle Leaves Locals Fearful”. UNHCR, Institute for War and Peace, September 29, 2009
“Governor of Paktia, Juma Khan Hamdard”. Demotix.com, November 15, 2009
“The North on the Brink”. Afghanistan Votes.com, June 15, 2010

Pashtun people
1954 births
Living people
Hezb-e Islami Gulbuddin politicians
Governors of Paktia Province
Governors of Jowzjan Province
Governors of Baghlan Province
People from Balkh Province